Eyes of Eternity is a 2003 heavy metal album released by Rob Rock. The album is his second release as a solo artist.

Track listing
 "Rock the Earth" (5:00)
 "Stranglehold" (4:34)
 "Eyes of Eternity"(4:10)
 "The Everlasting" (4:35)
 "Rage of Creation"(5:22)
 "Conqueror's Hymn" (4:47)
 "Fields of Fire"(5:34)
 "You Know" (5:33)
 "The Hour of Dawn" (12:28)
 "Beautiful Lady" (4:11)

Credits
Rob Rock – Lead and Backing Vocals
Roy Z – Guitars, Bass Guitar
Reynold “Butch” Carlson – Drums
Ray "Geezer" Burke – Bass Guitar
Mistheria - Keyboards
Rick Renstrom – Guitar
Bob Rossi – Guitar
Stephen Elder – Bass Guitar, Backing Vocals
Tracy Shell – Drums

References

2003 albums
Rob Rock albums
Massacre Records albums
Albums produced by Roy Z